Yau Nai-hoi is a Hong Kong screenwriter and director. He is best known as a frequent screenwriter for films produced by the independent Hong Kong production company Milkyway Image, notably films directed by Johnnie To and Wai Ka-Fai. Yau often collaborates with fellow Milkyway Image writers Wai Ka-Fai, Szeto Kam-Yuen, Au Kin-Yee and Yip Tin-Shing. His directorial debut arrived with the 2007 film Eye in the Sky.

Filmography
Blind Detective (2013) (writer)
Drug War (2012) (writer)
Romancing in Thin Air (2012) (writer)
Life Without Principle (2011) (writer)
Don't Go Breaking My Heart (2011) (writer)
Tactical Unit – Comrades in Arms (2009) (writer)
Triangle (2007) (writer)
Eye in the Sky (2007) (director) (writer)
Election 2 (a.k.a. Triad Election) (2006) (writer)
Election (2005) (writer)
Throw Down (2004) (writer)
Running on Karma (2003) (writer)
Turn Left, Turn Right (2003) (writer)
PTU (2003) (writer)
Love For All Seasons (2003) (writer)
My Left Eye Sees Ghosts (2002) (writer)
Fat Choi Spirit (2002) (writer)
Running Out of Time 2 (2001) (writer)
Love on a Diet (2001) (writer)
Wu yen (2001) (writer)
Needing You... (2000) (writer)
Help!!! (2000) (writer)
The Mission (1999) (writer)
Running Out of Time (1999) (writer)
Where a Good Man Goes (1999) (writer)
A Hero Never Dies (1998) (writer)
Expect the Unexpected (1998) (writer)
The Longest Nite (1998) (writer)
Lifeline (1997) (writer)
A Moment of Romance III (1996) (writer)
Loving You (1995) (writer)
The Bare-Footed Kid (1993) (writer)

Awards

External links
 

Hong Kong film directors
Hong Kong screenwriters
Hong Kong people
Living people
1968 births